"Trapecista" (English: Trapezist) is the sixth and last single released by Spanish singer-songwriter Enrique Iglesias from his eponymous debut studio album Enrique Iglesias (1995), It was released by Fonovisa on 16 September 1996 (see 1996 in music).

Song information
The track was written and produced by Rafael Pérez-Botija, and became Iglesias's fifth consecutive chart topper in the U.S., a new record for Iglesias, breaking Selena's record with her album Amor Prohibido (1994) and Jon Secada's with his album Otro Día Más Sin Verte (1992), both releasing four number-one singles. The video for this single was directed by Jon Small who directed the videos for "Si Tú Te Vas" and "Experiencia Religiosa".

Chart performance
The track debuted in the United States Billboard Hot Latin Tracks chart at number 13 on 16 November 1996, and rose to number 1 three weeks later, spending five weeks at the summit. The single spent ten weeks in the top ten.

See also
List of number-one Billboard Hot Latin Tracks of 1996
List of number-one Billboard Hot Latin Tracks of 1997

References

1996 singles
1995 songs
Enrique Iglesias songs
Spanish-language songs
Songs written by Rafael Pérez-Botija
1990s ballads
Pop ballads
Rock ballads
Fonovisa Records singles